Gordon Oliver (1910–1995) was an American actor and film producer.

Gordon Oliver may also refer to:
Gordon Oliver (South African politician), former  Mayor of Cape Town
Gordon Oliver (English politician), former Mayor of Torbay

See also
Oliver Gordon (disambiguation)